A Tribute to Miles is a tribute album recorded by the then surviving members of the Miles Davis "Second Great" Quintet: pianist Herbie Hancock, saxophonist Wayne Shorter, bassist Ron Carter and drummer Tony Williams. Taking the Miles role was trumpeter Wallace Roney.

This album won all five men the Grammy Award for Best Jazz Instrumental Performance, Individual or Group at the 37th Annual Grammy Awards.

Track listing
"So What" (Live) (Miles Davis) - 10:20
"RJ" (Ron Carter) - 4:06
"Little One" (Herbie Hancock) - 7:20
"Pinocchio" (Wayne Shorter) - 5:44
"Elegy" (Tony Williams) - 8:42
"Eighty One" (Miles Davis, Ron Carter) - 7:31
"All Blues" (Live) (Miles Davis) - 15:14

Source:

Personnel
Musicians
Herbie Hancock – piano, calliope
Wayne Shorter – tenor saxophone, soprano saxophone
Wallace Roney – trumpet
Ron Carter – bass
Tony Williams – drums

Production
Herbie Hancock – producer
Wayne Shorter – producer
Ron Carter – producer
Tony Williams – producer, liner notes
Suzy Gaal – associate producer
Tony Meilandt – executive producer
James Heffernan – executive producer

Bob Skye – engineer (live recording: tracks 1, 7) 
Tomoo Suzuki – engineer (studio recording: tracks 2-6, mixing)
Allen Sides – engineer (mixing)
Bernie Grundman – engineer (mastering)
Manny LaCarrubba – assistant engineer
Tom Hardisty – assistant engineer
Dave Hecht – assistant engineer
Eric Rudd – assistant engineer
Mark Gilbeault – assistant engineer
Rall Rogut – assistant engineer

Hiroyuki Arakawa – photography
Yohji Yamamoto – costume design
Maxine Van-Cliffe Arakawa – art direction
Takashi Ohmura – hair & make-up
Dirk Walter – package design, illustration

References

1994 albums
Grammy Award for Best Jazz Instrumental Album
Herbie Hancock albums
Miles Davis tribute albums
Ron Carter albums
Tony Williams (drummer) albums
Wayne Shorter albums
Qwest Records albums